Barbara Jean Sykora (born March 5, 1941) is an American politician in the state of Minnesota. She served in the Minnesota House of Representatives.

References

Women state legislators in Minnesota
Republican Party members of the Minnesota House of Representatives
1941 births
Living people
People from Excelsior, Minnesota
People from Lyon County, Minnesota
St. Catherine University alumni
21st-century American women